The 94th Infantry Brigade was a British Army brigade formed during the First World War as part of the British 31st Division .

94th Brigade
The 31st Division is famous as one of Kitchener's Divisions of the New Army with their large number of Pals battalions that suffered heavy casualties during the Battle of the Somme . The 94th Brigade suffered some of the worst casualties during the First day on the Somme .

11th (Service) Battalion (Accrington), The East Lancashire Regiment (to 92nd Bde February 1918)
12th (Service) Battalion (Sheffield), The York and Lancaster Regiment (disbanded February 1918)
13th (Service) Battalion (1st Barnsley), The York and Lancaster Regiment (to 93rd Bde February 1918)
14th (Service) Battalion (2nd Barnsley), The York and Lancaster Regiment (disbanded February 1918)

94th (Yeomanry) Brigade
The brigade was disbanded in February 1918 then began reforming in May.  In June it was brought up to strength with the addition of Yeomanry battalions from the 74th (Yeomanry) Division and renamed the 94th (Yeomanry) Brigade.

12th (Norfolk Yeomanry) Battalion, Norfolk Regiment 
12th (Ayrshire and Lanarkshire Yeomanry) Battalion, Royal Scots Fusiliers
24th (Denbighshire Yeomanry) Battalion, Royal Welch Fusiliers

Sources 
 "The Somme, The Day by Day Account", Chris McCarthy, 1998, The Caxton Publishing Group. 

Pals Brigades of the British Army
Infantry brigades of the British Army in World War I